The ATC250R is a high-performance, three-wheeled ATV produced by Honda from 1981 to 1986. Cited at the first high performance ATC introduced, production began with an air-cooled, 248 cc single-cylinder two-stroke engine, but would see a liquid-cooled, 246 cc engine by 1985. All model years were fully suspended and adjustable, using air-assisted front forks and a single, remote reservoir gas-charged rear shock. 1981-1982 models offered 6.7 inches of front suspension travel and 4.3 inches in the rear, 1983-1984 offered 8.7 inches in front and 8.1 inches rear, while post-1985 Models allowed 9.8 inches of travel. All model years also used a gear-driven counter-balancer to reduce engine vibration. Dual disc brakes were used on all model years, with the exception of the 1981, which used a front disc and a rear drum.

1st Generation (1981-1982)

The introduction of the 1981 ATC250R marked a milestone in off-road history, as it was the first two-stroke ATC designed specifically for racing. While ATC racing was in its infancy, racers had to rely on Honda's ATC110 and ATC185 models on the racetrack. Both of these four-stroke models were sluggish and poorly suspended when compared to the 2-stroke ATC250R, which borrowed heavily from the Honda CR250R motocross line.

2nd Generation (1983-1984)

The 1983 ATC250R incorporated many improvements, introducing the Pro-Link suspension, folding foot pegs, a larger fuel tank, slightly longer travel suspension in front and rear. While the engine design remained similar, the Fuel delivery was increased from the previous 27 mm, to a 30 mm round-slide carburetor

3rd Generation (1985-1987)

In 1985 the ATC250R was updated with a 246cc liquid cooled engine, and 6-speed transmission. This 2-stroke engine was notable for not incorporating a power-valve, featured commonly on other machines by 1985. Fuel was delivered via a 34 mm round carb in 1985 and flat slide carburetor for the remainder of production.

This would be the last Generation offered for sale, discontinued in the United States in 1986, after an agreement between manufacturers and the Consumer Product Safety Commission to cease production on all 3-wheeled ATVs resulting from thousands of legal battles regarding safety issues and high accident rates. US Dealers were instructed to remove the motors and other common parts of remaining models, and then cut the frames in half to prevent new sales.

The 1987 ATC250R models were released in limited numbers in Europe and Canada. While rumors persist that the 1987 Models were intended to feature new colors, a redesigned logo, and possibly keyed ignition, these models were virtually identical to the ‘86 offering.

Though sold concurrently, the Honda TRX250R would remain in the Honda line-up until 1989, effectively becoming the ATC's successor. The four-wheeler used many of the same components as the ATC250R, including a slightly detuned version of the ATC's engine.

Competitive Racing

Honda created the ATC250R as a consumer sport ATV, but would offer multiple variations to their factory racing teams in the 1980s. These machines were designed for several displacement classes. The ATC125R, ATC200R, ATC300R, ATC350R, ATC400R, ATC480R, and ATC500R were all tested at various times during ATC production.

The Honda ATC250R's competition came largely from the Kawasaki KXT Tecate 250 and Yamaha Tri-Z 250, and to a smaller extent from companies such as Tiger ATV. From in-house, the ATC250R is often compared to the Honda ATC350X, a sport ATC featuring a 350cc 4-stroke engine. The ATC350X was not competitive on professional circuits, and was better suited to amateur racing and recreational riding.

Engine Specifications 
Engine type - Water-cooled 1985–1986, 2-stroke, single-cylinder
Bore & Stroke - 66 x 72 mm
Displacement - 248 cc for 1981-1984 or 246 cc for 1985 and 1986
Compression ratio - 8.0 to 1

Lubrication - fuel:oil mixture
Air filtration - foam element

Cylinder Bore - 66.020 - 66.040
Piston/cylinder clearance - 0.060 - 0.080
Piston Diameter - 65.94 - 65.96 mm
Pison pin bore - 18.007 - 18.013 mm
Piston pin outer diameter - 17.994 - 18.000 mm
Piston-to-piston pin clearance - .007 - .019 mm
Piston rings per piston compression - 2
Ring end gap - .20 - .40 mm
Ring side clearance - .045 - .075 mm
Connecting rod (sm end inner diameter) - 21.997 - 22.009 mm

References

Honda ATVs
Vehicles introduced in 1981